Gem Collector is an eCommerce website. Previously it was a British reverse auction loose gemstone shopping channel. It is the first channel of its kind in the UK. The channel was available on Sky and online. The channel operations are based at Eagle Road Studios in Redditch, near Birmingham. The channel broadcast live between 19:00 and midnight daily.

Pre-launch
Gem Collector began beta testing on 8 October 2010; on the same day Gems TV celebrated its 6th birthday. The channel has replaced the former Gems TV 2 EPG slot on Sky. The channel was using the former Gems TV 2/Rocks TV studio, which was also at the time being used by sister channel Jewellery Maker.

The channel officially launched at 19:00 on Monday 11 October 2010.

Closure
On 13 December 2010, it was announced on Barry Kirley's official Facebook page that Gem Collector as a stand-alone channel would cease broadcasting by the end of December and would continue from January 2011 as a programming strand within Rocks TV, which in itself rebranded as Gems TV Extra on 1 January 2011 and moved from 647 to 656

Programme block
Gemcollector is now broadcast on its website only.

References

External links
Official website

Shopping networks in the United Kingdom
Defunct television channels in the United Kingdom
Television channels and stations established in 2010
Jewellery retailers of the United Kingdom